Hack Urquhart Stephenson (November 5, 1872 – January 20, 1949) was an American physician and politician who served in the Virginia House of Delegates from 1910 to 1914.

References

External links 

1872 births
1949 deaths
Democratic Party members of the Virginia House of Delegates
20th-century American politicians
People from Southampton County, Virginia
Physicians from Virginia
20th-century American physicians
University of Richmond alumni
Medical College of Virginia alumni